New Hudson Motorcycles was a British motorcycle manufacturer. Founded in 1903 by George Patterson  in Birmingham, their first motorcycle was produced in 1902 but was unsuccessful. The New Hudson range expanded between 1910 and 1915 using JAP engines, then the factory joined the war effort until 1919. As well as side-valve and OHV single-cylinder engines of 350 to 600 cc, they also built a 211 cc two-stroke and a number of three-wheelers with MAG engines. In 1927 Bert le Vack broke the  record at Brooklands on a 500 cc New Hudson.

The firm stopped motorcycle production in 1932 and changed their name to Girling Ltd – which still exists as a brake-component company.  Bikes were made under the New Hudson name after the Second World War, when they became a subsidiary of Birmingham Small Arms Company (BSA) and manufactured successful autocycles until 1957.

Models

See also
List of motorcycles of the 1910s
List of motorcycles of the 1920s

References

Further reading

External links

 Site dedicated to the New Hudson Marque
 New Hudson adverts gallery
 

Defunct motor vehicle manufacturers of England
1903 establishments in England
Defunct companies based in Birmingham, West Midlands